Tyler Deis (born July 10, 1974) is a Canadian former professional ice hockey player. Between 1999 and 2004 Deis played 315 games in the ECHL where he scored 86 goals and 131 assists for 217 points while earning 682 penalty minutes.

Deis is currently the Head coach of the Okotoks Oilers in the AJHL. He won coach of the year in the 2017–18 season.

References

External links

1974 births
Living people
Canadian ice hockey right wingers
Charlotte Checkers (1993–2010) players
Cincinnati Cyclones (ECHL) players
Greenville Grrrowl players
Minnesota State Mavericks men's ice hockey players
Mobile Mysticks players
Wichita Thunder players
Ice hockey people from Calgary

Minnesota State University, Mankato alumni